The Pharmacy Maniac is the name of an unidentified Russian serial killer who killed 2 men in Chelyabinsk in 2011, both of them in pharmacies. He remains uncaptured, and his motives have not been fully established.

Murders 

The offender committed his first murder on May 26, 2011. Wearing a medical mask, glasses, and a hat, the perpetrator walked into a "Classic" pharmacy at 34 Lenina Prospekt in the Chelyabinsk city center. In his hands, he carried a sawn-off shotgun and a black cellophane bag. At the time the perpetrator entered the pharmacy, there was a total of eight people there - 4 employees and 4 customers. He proceeded to demand valuables from those in the pharmacy, stating "I need 60 thousand rubles. Put the money in, whoever doesn’t want to, can move away, [but] I will shoot [them] in the stomach." Later, 2 more women went into the pharmacy, and the robber ordered them to give him their jewelry and step aside. The women gave the perpetrator gold chains, a bracelet, a ring, a cross, and a church pendant. While this was happening, some people were able to escape the pharmacy from an exit in another room. Then, Vladamir Shin, a 49-year-old man, entered the pharmacy to buy medicine. Seeing the robbery in progress, Shin attempted to run out the front door. The offender yelled "Stop," and fatally shot Shin in the chest. The assailant then fled the scene.

On August 10, 2011, the offender walked into another Classic pharmacy - 500 meters away from the first attack - at 5:30 pm. Upon entering, he shot Igor Ustinov, 30. Visitors of the pharmacy ran into another room and huddled in a corner. Without stealing anything, the perpetrator then went outside to reload his gun. After his gun was reloaded, the perpetrator once again entered the pharmacy. Walking past the wounded Ustinov, the attacker asked "Where is he?" The offender then walked back to Ustinov and shot him in the head several times. According to witnesses, the perpetrator then said "It's your fault," or "It's all your fault, white coats." Satisfied that the victim was dead, he put his gun into his cellophane bag and left.

Investigation 
After the second murder, the theory of a serial killer emerged, since both victims were shot with the same weapon. The offender committed attacks only on shops belonging to the "Classic" brand. According to witnesses, the criminal looked ridiculous, behaved uncertainly and often expressed himself in phrases used by stereotypical American soldiers. His appearance did not make a positive impression on anyone.

After panic ensued after the second murder, the Chelyabinsk police began working even more diligently. The network of pharmacies "Classic" was taken under special jurisdiction, and the facial composite of the alleged killer was posted on public transport, shops and large office buildings. For any information leading to his capture, a reward of 1,000,000 rubles was assigned. The inability of the police to catch the maniac has caused widespread criticism of the Chelyabinsk law enforcement system in the mass media.

There is an assumption by some that the killer has bipolar disorder, but conclusions from experts of the regional psychoneurological hospital, who made up his offender profile, claim the opposite. Psychiatrists believe he had a mercenary motive, but due to lack of experience, the killer left the crime scene before taking much money or valuables. The Pharmacy Maniac did, however, prepare for his crimes in advance. The offender remains unapprehended, his motives remain unclear and suspects are lacking. Cases of "imitators" have also been recorded. Attempts to mathematically calculate the maniac's actions have led to nothing. In 2016 the investigation was intensified, with an active search for suspects again being conducted.

In the media 
In the first season of the television series "Karpov" (2013), the 29th episode titled Others is based on the Pharmacy Maniac.

See also 
 Batman rapist
 List of fugitives from justice who disappeared
 List of Russian serial killers

References

External links 
 Inna Osipova: "Looking for a pharmaceutical maniac in Chelyabinsk". NTV.
 In Chelyabinsk, a "pharmacy" maniac killer is operating. Theme of the week.
 In Chelyabinsk, the "Pharmacy Maniac" is not caught, the killer Seredkin is also not found

Filmed killings
Male serial killers
Russian male criminals
Russian serial killers
Unidentified serial killers
Unsolved murders in Russia